Manikchak Assembly constituency is an assembly constituency in Malda district in the Indian state of West Bengal.

Overview
As per orders of the Delimitation Commission, No. 49 Manikchak Assembly constituency covers Manikchak community development block, and Milki, Fulbaria and Sovanagar  gram panchayats of English Bazar community development block.

Manikchak Assembly constituency is part of No. 8 Maldaha Dakshin (Lok Sabha constituency). It was earlier part of Malda (Lok Sabha constituency).

Members of Legislative Assembly

Election results

2021

2011
In the 2011 elections, Sabitri Mitra of Trinamool Congress defeated her nearest rival Ratna Bhattacharya of CPI(M).

Ramprabesh Mandal, who had filed his nomination as an Independent candidate was a rebel Congress candidate. He withdrew on the last day for withdrawal of nominations.

.# Swing based on Congress+Trinamool Congress vote percentages taken together in 2006.

1977–2006
In the 2006 and 2001 state assembly elections, Asima Chowdhuri of CPI(M) won the Manikchak assembly seat defeating her nearest rival Ram Probesh Mondal of Congress. Contests in most years were multi cornered but only winners and runners are being mentioned. Ram Probesh Mondal of Congress defeated Subodh Choudhary of CPI(M) in 1996. Subodh Choudhary of CPI(M) defeated Ram Probesh Mondal of Congress in 1991 Jokhilal Mandal of Congress in 1987. Jokhilal Mandal of Congress defeated Subodh Choudhary of CPI(M) in 1982. Subodh Choudhary of CPI(M) defeated Jokhilal Mandal of Congress in 1977.

1951–1972
Jokhilal Mandal of Congress won in 1972 and 1971. Arun Chandra Jha of Congress won in 1969. R.S.Singhi of Swatantra Party won in 1967. Sowrindra Mohan Misra of Congress won in 1962. The Manikchak seat was not there in 1957. In independent India's first election in 1951, Pashupati Jha of Congress won from the Manikchak seat.

References

Assembly constituencies of West Bengal
Politics of Malda district